João Carlos dos Santos or simply known as João Carlos (born 10 September 1972) is a Brazilian former footballer who played as a defender. He played for the Brazil national team at 1999 Copa América in Paraguay.

Career statistics

Club

International

Honours

Club
Corinthians
Campeonato Brasileiro Série A: 1999
FIFA Club World Championship: 2000

International
Brazil
Copa América Champions : 1999

References

External links

 

1972 births
Living people
Brazilian footballers
Brazilian football managers
Brazilian expatriate footballers
Expatriate footballers in Japan
Campeonato Brasileiro Série A players
J1 League players
J2 League players
Brazil international footballers
1999 Copa América players
1999 FIFA Confederations Cup players
Copa América-winning players
Campeonato Brasileiro Série D managers
Esporte Clube Democrata players
Cruzeiro Esporte Clube players
Democrata Futebol Clube players
Sport Club Corinthians Paulista players
Cerezo Osaka players
Botafogo de Futebol e Regatas players
Paysandu Sport Club players
América Futebol Clube (MG) players
Democrata Futebol Clube managers
Villa Nova Atlético Clube managers
Association football defenders